André Anderson Pomilio Lima da Silva (born 23 September 1999), known as André Anderson, is a professional footballer who plays as a forward for São Paulo, on loan from Lazio. Born in Brazil, he has represented Italy at youth level.

Club career

Early career
Born in Maracaí but raised in Pedrinhas Paulista, both in the São Paulo state, André Anderson joined Santos FC's youth setup in 2009. Initially playing in the club's futsal youth squads, he moved to football in 2010, and subsequently progressed through the youth setup.

A spotlight in the club's youth categories, André Anderson signed his first professional deal with the club in November 2015, running until October 2018. In July of the latter year, he rejected an offer of renewal.

Lazio
On 14 August 2018, André Anderson signed with the Italian Serie A club Lazio.

Loan to Salernitana
On 17 August 2018, André Anderson joined Serie B club Salernitana on a season-long loan. He made his professional debut on 4 November, coming on as a second-half substitute for Antonio Palumbo in 1–0 away loss against Venezia.

André Anderson scored his first professional goal on 18 January 2019, netting the equalizer in a 2–1 away defeat of Palermo.

Second loan to Salernitana
On 5 October 2020, he returned to Salernitana on loan.

Loan to São Paulo
On 11 April 2022, Anderson joined São Paulo on loan until 30 June 2023, with an option to buy.

International career
Although born in Brazil, André Anderson is eligible to Italy due to his ancestry. On 4 February 2019, he was called up to the latter's under-20s.

Honours
Lazio
Supercoppa Italiana: 2019

References

External links
 
 

1999 births
Living people
Footballers from São Paulo (state)
Italian footballers
Italy youth international footballers
Brazilian footballers
Brazilian people of Italian descent
Association football forwards
S.S. Lazio players
U.S. Salernitana 1919 players
São Paulo FC players
Serie A players
Serie B players